Vavasour is a term for a feudal vassal or tenant of a baron.

Vavasour may also refer to:

Vavasour (surname), a list of people so named
Vavasour or Vavasor Powell (1617–1670), Welsh Nonconformist Puritan preacher, evangelist, church leader and writer
Baron Vavasour, an abeyant title in the Peerage of England
Vavasour baronets, three extinct titles in the Baronetage of England, one extinct and one extant title in the Baronetage of the United Kingdom
Mount Vavasour, Banff National Park, Alberta, Canada

See also
Vavasseur, a surname